San Bruno Mountain is a horst fault-block mountain located in northern San Mateo County, California; with northern slopes rising in southern San Francisco.  It is surrounded by San Francisco Bay and the cities of Brisbane, Colma, Daly City, and South San Francisco.

Topped by a four mile long ridge, trails along its summit afford expansive views of the San Francisco Bay Area. Radio Peak (elevation ) is the highest point, with several radio/TV broadcast towers, serving an area that would otherwise have poor service in the hilly Bay Area region.  Much of the mountain lies within the  San Bruno Mountain State Park.  Next to the state park is the  state San Bruno Mountain Ecological Reserve on the north slope.

The distinct geology and weather of San Bruno Mountain set it apart from other California coastal areas. The mountain provides habitat for several species of rare and endangered plants (see below) and butterflies; the Callippe silverspot, Mission blue, and San Bruno elfin butterfly all inhabit this mountain and few other locations.  The mountain is also a cradle for economically-useful plants; the low-growing Arctostaphylos uva-ursi "San Bruno Mountain Manzanita" has become an evergreen groundcover widely used in drought-resistant landscaping.

Location
The southern border of San Francisco runs along the base of the northern hillside, while Daly City's original "top-of-the-hill" community at the westernmost point of the mountain was founded on John Daly's dairy farm by SF residents fleeing the 1906 quake. The postwar residential neighborhoods of Southern Hills and Bayshore encircle the north side of the mountain. The construction of these homes inspired Malvina Reynolds to write the song Little Boxes, which became a 1964 Billboard Hot 100 hit for singer Pete Seeger.  The Bayshore neighborhood features the 1941 Cow Palace indoor arena, and faces a large bay-landfill. Reputedly, an exploratory gold mine exists on the mountain, above the Southern Hills.

Brisbane is on an eastern prominence, while the residential portion of the community of South San Francisco borders the southeast.   Almost two miles of the southern flank of the mountain is abutted by the many large urban cemeteries of Colma, many which were developed after the City and County of San Francisco evicted all burial grounds from the county in 1912.

The 144-acre Guadalupe quarry on the south side of Guadalupe Canyon is presently owned and operated by American Rock and Asphalt, Inc., while the Crocker Industrial Park occupies much of the canyon floor.  Radio towers occupy the highest (1,319 ft) peak, and may be accessed from the San Bruno County Park center, in the "saddle" between the north and south ridges.

A series of historic maps and photos of the area may be viewed at the website of the City of Brisbane.

Topography, geology, climate

San Bruno Mountain is a part of the Franciscan Formation; diverse types of rocks laid down in the Mesozoic, then uplifted as fault-blocks starting in the Pleistocene; prior to the initial occurrence of the San Andreas transform-fault.  The formation is centered on present-day San Francisco, composed of small ranges trending northwest-to-southeast from this the peninsula up into Marin County.  

Slightly to the east of the highest peak, south of the main range, a small block reaches  in South San Francisco, it is called Sign Hill because of large concrete letters emplaced by the city of South San Francisco. In the 1850s, San Francisco Bay still lapped directly against the eastern flank of San Bruno Mountain, but today the entire bay shoreline is fill.

The region is drained by two streams: Guadalupe Valley Creek flows east between the two ranges to reach the Bay north of Brisbane - most of it now runs through underground culverts.  Colma Creek rises from a source in San Bruno Mountain State and County Park; it runs west into the deep cleft of Colma Canyon, then turns southeast and runs south of the mountain (fed by Twelve-Mile Creek along Westborough Boulevard, and at least eight other streams) until it reaches the San Francisco Bay north of San Francisco International Airport. Formerly, steelhead trout swam almost to the headwaters of Colma Creek to spawn; boats used to travel up to what is now Molloy's Tavern on Old Mission Road. Seasonal creeks to drain runoff cut ravines in the south face; after a heavy rain a 12-foot waterfall appears in Juncus ravine behind Hillside School while others may be found in Guadalupe canyon.

These features are underlain primarily with late Cretaceous dark greenish-gray graywacke, a poorly sorted sandstone containing angular rock fragments (about 10% feldspar and detrital chert).  The fragments imply a rapid erosion and burial in a depositional basin, with few fossils.  Exposed graywacke can be observed on high ridges and on steep canyon walls.  Radiolarian chert is exposed on certain south facing slopes of San Bruno Mountain and at Point San Bruno.  The most notable rock is serpentine, a greenish soft material (and the California State Rock).  Outcrops are found near Serbian Ravine and at Point San Bruno.  Serpentine has an unusual and diverse mineral composition - serpentine soils host plants not commonly found.  San Bruno Mountain is a habitat for a variety of rare plants, which host even-rarer animal life.  

An unusual feature is an inland sand-dune (Colma formation) on the western slope behind Daly City's John F. Kennedy Elementary School, more than two-and-a-half miles from the ocean and elevated more than seven hundred feet above sea-level.  An undeveloped gold deposit is recorded on the mountain in Daly City, while a small silver, lead, and zinc mine was registered by the South San Francisco Land And Improvement Company in 1919, it is not known to have been worked.

The climate is dominated by marine air flow, temperatures are mild in all seasons. Mild summer temperatures are further reduced by the annual appearance of marine fog enshrouding the mountains most mornings between late June and October;  particularly affecting the western slopes. On occasions the mountain has temporarily been covered with snow (recorded in December 1932, January 1952, January 1957, January 1962, February 5, 1976, February 26, 2011, and February 5, 2019).

History
The earliest Spanish explorers of the San Francisco peninsula found it occupied by Ramaytush-speaking Ohlone peoples.  The Yelamu seasonal hamlet of Siplichiquin occupied the southeastern point of the mountain, sheltered from western breezes and facing an oyster-laden cove; the occupants covered their dead with the shells.  Tested samples from the Siplichiquin shellmound indicate regular and continuous occupation from 3,200 BCE  (contemporary with the earliest days of Ancient Egypt) through AD 1800.  Another prehistoric shell midden (name unknown and now denominated SMA-299) is on the south flank of the mountain where Colma Creek entered the salt marshes that formerly lined San Francisco Bay (near present-day El Camino High School), presently considered an outlying hamlet of Urebure.

The Portola expedition visited San Francisco Bay in 1769; Sergeant Ortega's party of scouts crossed Montara Mountain, reached the Golden Gate, and are considered the first Europeans to have seen San Bruno Mountain. In 1774 (prior to the expedition of Juan Bautista de Anza) Alta California governor Fernando Rivera y Moncada, Father Palóu and four soldiers climbed the mountain and watched the sun rise across the bay.  The mountain was named in 1775 or 1776 by Bruno de Heceta to honor his patron saint, and Sierra de San Bruno appears on the land-map of Rancho Cañada de Guadalupe drawn by Jean Jacques Vioget (presently in the collections of the Bancroft Library, University of California, Berkeley) some time in the 1840s. That name was continued in use by the Geological Survey of California in 1865, which described the place as a short range extending from Sierra Point nearly to the Pacific Ocean.

San Bruno Mountain incorporates portions of five Spanish/Mexican land grants; the southernmost and largest being Rancho Buri Buri.  Jose Antonio Sanchez, who rode by mule as a child from Sonora, was awarded Rancho Buri Buri in 1827, with confirmation by the new government in 1835. Rancho Buri Buri extended from the bay salt flats to San Andreas Valley and from Daly City to Burlingame. Its northern extremity included "La Portezuela" (Doorway) between the western end of the mountain and the coastal upthrust along the San Andreas Fault, the juncture of Mission Street and El Camino Real. This was the main route between San Francisco and the peninsula before 1907, initially established to serve the missions, adopted by the Overland Stage in 1857, followed by the San Francisco and San Jose Railroad in 1863 and the Southern Pacific.  Three other ranchos held minor portions of the northern flank of the mountain: Rancho Laguna de la Merced, Rancho Rincon de las Salinas y Potrero Viejo, and a corner of Rancho San Miguel included the hills of the north range.  

Rancho Canada de Guadalupe la Visitacion y Rodeo Viejo, however, contained most of the present day San Bruno Mountain, including the present-day city of Brisbane, Guadalupe Valley, Crocker Industrial Park, Visitacion Valley  and the rodeo grounds south of Islais Creek. In 1835 Governor Vallejo granted this rancho to his brother-in-law Jacob P. Leese; he exchanged it for a rancho in present-day Lake County owned by Yerba Buena character Robert T. Ridley and his wife Presentacion (daughter of Juana Briones de Miranda). The Visitacion rancho was actioned after Ridley's death in 1851, despite a claim by the widow.
 
The US Coast Survey sketch of San Francisco Bay drawn in 1853 from observations made from 1850-52 labels the mountain as Abbey Hill, the name was not corrected on US Coast Survey maps until 1869.  The United States Geological Survey surveyed the San Francisco area, producing a 15-minute topographic map in 1892 and updating it in 1899.

When the county of San Francisco divested itself of cemeteries (prohibiting burials after 1900), new ones were established just over the county line. The oldest graveyard in Colma along the southern flank of the mountain, Holy Cross Roman Catholic Cemetery, went into service in 1887, quickly followed by Jewish institutions Hills of Eternity Memorial Park and Home of Peace Cemetery moving from San Francisco.  The Chinese Six Companies established Hoy Sun Ning Yung Cemetery in 1898, while the most recent (and sixteenth) development is the neighboring Golden Hill Memorial Park & Funeral Home, begun in 1994.

The road to the top of the mountain (Radio Road) does not appear on the 1950 USGS 7.5-minute topographic map, but does appear on the 1956 edition.  In 1949 KRON (Channel 4) was the first television station to place a transmitter tower on Radio Peak, followed by KQED and KTVU, though these latter tenants moved their transmitters to Sutro Tower in the 1970s, while KTSF now transmits from Mount Allison.  Radio Peak currently houses TV broadcasts for KRON, KOFY (and sister stations KCNZ and KQRM), KKPX, and KNTV.    A number of FM radio stations built transmitter towers on the mountain, and in 2005, KNTV moved its transmitter to the mountain, on the former KCSM-TV tower. KTSF occupied the former KRON site until 2018, when it entered into a channel sharing agreement with KDTV-DT and moved to its site on Mount Allison. Radio transmitters presently on San Bruno Mountain include KIOI, KITS, KMEL, KMVQ, KOSF (formerly KSFX), KQED, and KSAN, 

In 1954, construction was begun for an early-warning radar and missile-control site on the mountaintop. It became active in 1956, controlling Nike anti-aircraft defense systems at Fort Funston (SF-59) and Milagra Ridge (SF-51), and remained in service through March 1963.  The site has been re-purposed, and no trace can now be seen.  The runways of San Francisco Airport are three miles from the peak; in 1998 a United Airlines 747 lost power in an engine and nearly crashed into the peak.

Westbay controversy 
In 1965, Westbay Community Associates announced a plan to level a portion of the mountain to fill  of San Francisco Bay north of Sierra Point with landfill. The proposal intended to create housing developments in the "Saddle" and in the landfill zone. A four-lane limited-access road to connect the Bayshore Road to Radio Road was constructed to service the traffic from the proposed development; named the Guadalupe Canyon Parkway it was completed in 1968.  In order to remove  of earth from the ridge, Westbay proposed using a conveyor belt system to transport the fill across Bayshore Boulevard and Bayshore Freeway to offshore barges, which would then deposit the material along the shores of the Bay.  Opposition by organizations such as Save The Bay and the residents of Brisbane led to the defeat of Westbay's conveyor plan in June 1967 and eventual cessation of landfill operations at Sierra Point by December 1972.

Creation of State/County Park 
In 1970, the Crocker Land Company and Foremost/McKesson partnered in development company Visitacion Associates, and 3,600 acres of the undeveloped mountain real-estate was transferred to the new entity.  Visitacion announced development of 8,500 residential units and 2 million square feet of commercial and office-space, to begin construction in 1975.  Active opposition to development on the mountain continued, organized as the Committee to Save San Bruno Mountain, and in 1972 San Mateo County voters approved Proposition A (a program for acquiring undeveloped land for county parks) by 147,805 to 74,167. Years of litigation over this plan was settled with Visitacion and Crocker donating 546 acres on the main ridge, and selling 1,100 more to the County in 1978.  The State purchased 256 additional acres at the "Saddle" in 1980, and placed them under County management. In 1989, the state Wildlife Conservation Board purchased another 83 acres and created a San Bruno Mountain Ecological Reserve.

But, in 1978, the Mission blue butterfly was declared an endangered species.  Visitacion and Crocker Land hired Los Angeles legal firm Nossaman LLP, and in 1982 environmental attorney Robert D. Thornton pioneered the Habitat Conservation Plan (HCP) concept.  An HCP is "a planning document designed to accommodate economic development to the extent possible by authorizing the limited and unintentional take of listed species when it occurs incidental to otherwise lawful activities"  He proposed creating the first such plan for the area around San Bruno Mountain.  In the case of endangered San Bruno Mountain flora and fauna, it allowed new mountain developments at Terrabay, the Northeast Ridge in Brisbane (built in the mid 1990s, it has streets and civic features after the endangered species it displaced), as well as at Village in the Park (built in 1985), Pointe Pacific (1986), and Bayshore Heights (1995) in Daly City.  The accomomdation offset for each development was to be the creation of equivalent new habitat nearby, which has not been substantially completed after forty years.

Terra Bay development 

The Terra Bay project was approved in the mid-1980s for development at the south and southeast base of San Bruno Mountain. Terra Bay was constructed in three phases: the first phase constructed townhomes and detached houses; the second phase constructed more housing units, including one of the tallest buildings in South San Francisco, a condominium tower named the Peninsula Mandalay, and the third phase constructed an office building named Centennial Towers. The original developer, W.W. Dean & Associates, was unable to complete the project, and SunChase Holdings acquired the project in 1992, completing site preparation before selling the parcels for Phase I to Centex Homes.

The Terra Bay site was known to include habitat for the Mission blue and Callippe silverspot butterflies; the original developer received a  fine in 1983 for bulldozing part of the habitat during site preparation. Under the terms established by the 1982 amendment to the Endangered Species Act, the nation's first-ever Habitat Conservation Plan (HCP) was agreed upon, allowing developers to destroy the habitat of endangered species if substitute lands were made available. SunChase agreed to fund ecological restoration to mitigate the impact of Terra Bay during the development of Phase I under the terms of the San Bruno HCP. SunChase entered a joint venture with Myers Development for the development of Phases II and III; although Phase III had  of land available for construction, the completed Centennial Towers was scaled back to fit on just , partly in order to establish a buffer zone between the development and an ancient shellmound.

The Holman & Associates report was not made public for nearly ten years, with leaked copies circulating privately in 1997, and a public copy incorporated in the draft Environmental Impact Report in 1998. A lawsuit was settled out of court, resulting in the developer selling the land which included the shellmound and habitat for the Mission blue and Callippe silverspot butterflies to The Trust for Public Land, who would incorporate the parcel into San Bruno Mountain State Park. Ultimately, Terra Bay Phase III was scaled back significantly from the original mixed-use retail/office proposal. The shorter 12-story south tower was completed in 2009, and the taller 21-story north tower was completed in 2020 after the project was acquired by a different developer. The finished two-tower property was acquired by Ventas in late 2020.

Vegetation and ecology

The northern end of the San Francisco peninsula was primarily covered by plant communities of the grasslands, coastal scrub, redwood and mixed evergreen forest types prior to being overtaken by urban development.  And, though much of the Pacific side of the Santa Cruz Mountains south of Montara Mountain is forested, grasslands and scrub predominated from Montara Mountain to the Golden Gate.  Along the San Francisco Bay, most of the original wetlands have been filled in by sediment from inland human activities (hydraulic mining, dredging, farmland runoff) and by purposeful landfill.  More than eighty small streams draining to the Bay provided riparian habitat along the peninsula.

San Bruno mountain is not only one of the largest remaining examples of the original ecosystems, but also encompasses many microsystems in its relatively small area.  The mineral content of the underlying rock and the high velocity marine air have evolved unusual varieties of flora and sustained specialized fauna that live among them.  There are a variety of habitats in this mountainous area, and notably the following rare or endangered flora:

 Coast rock cress (Arabis blepharophylla)
 Franciscan Wallflower (Erysimum franciscanum)
 Montara Manzanita (Arctostaphylos montaraensis)
 Niebla halei lichen
 Pacifica Manzanita (Arctostaphylos pacifica)
 San Bruno Mountain Manzanita (Arctostaphylos imbricata)
 San Francisco Campion (Silene verecunda)
 San Francisco Lessinga (Lessingia germanorum)
 San Francisco Owl's Clover (Orthocarpus floribundus)

Undeveloped portions of the mountain that sit between the state park and the counties of San Mateo and San Francisco are still privately owned and at risk for development. Examples of these locations include the prehistoric sand dunes above Hillside Park in Daly City, and the eucalyptus groves bordering the Crocker and Southern Hills neighborhoods of Daly City. These areas are of great ecological significance, hosting the same plant and animal communities as found in the state park.

See also

 San Bruno Mountain State Park
 San Bruno Mountain Ecological Reserve
 List of California state parks
 List of summits of the San Francisco Bay Area
 Rancho Cañada de Guadalupe la Visitación y Rodeo Viejo
 Colma Creek
 Guadalupe Valley Creek
 Santa Cruz Mountains
 San Andreas Fault
 Franciscan Complex
 San Francisco garter snake
 Mission blue butterfly
 Mission blue butterfly habitat conservation
 San Bruno elfin butterfly
 Callippe silverspot butterfly
 United Airlines Flight 863

References

External sources

 
 Environmental Services Agency of San Mateo County, information on history, trails, park map, activities, park hours.
 San Bruno Mountain State Park
 San Bruno Mountain Watch, whose mission is to preserve San Bruno Mountain's Native American village sites and endangered habitats.
 Trailspotting: Hiking San Bruno Mountain Description, Photos and GPS/mapping data
 Climate Survey of San Bruno Mountain, prepared for Crocker Land Company by Metronics Associates, Palo Alto, Ca., October 20, 1967
 Elizabeth McClintock and Walter Knight, A Flora of the San Bruno Mountains, San Mateo County, California, Proceedings of the California Academy of Sciences, Fourth Series, Volume XXXII, no. 20, pp. 587–677, November 29, 1968
 J.D. Whitney, Geological Survey of California (1865)
 John Hunter Thomas, A Flora of the Santa Cruz Mountains (1960)
 USGS TopoView site <https://ngmdb.usgs.gov/topoview/viewer/#11/37.6634/-122.4155>.

Santa Cruz Mountains
Mountains of San Francisco
Mountains of San Mateo County, California
Mountains of the San Francisco Bay Area
Mountains of Northern California